All Saints Catholic High School is a Roman Catholic secondary school with academy status in Sheffield, South Yorkshire, England.

Admissions
The All Saints Catholic High School serves boys and girls between the ages of eleven and eighteen. Currently, there are approximately 1,300 pupils along with 114 teaching staff and 64 support staff. Both the school and integrated Sixth Form are oversubscribed each year, with around three students applying for each place.

History
De la Salle College was a direct grant grammar school from 1946 until 1976. It was located on Scott Road, in the suburb of Pitsmoor. The area is now a housing estate, featuring names that remember the past use of the site such as College Close and De la Salle Drive. The college was used in the war by the Royal Air Force as a barrage balloon unit headquarters for defending Sheffield from aerial attack.

The school in its present form was founded in September 1976 with the merger of De la Salle College (a grammar school) and St. Paul's school (on the current site). In 1983, the De la Salle site was closed and, along with the closure of St. Peter's RC school, many pupils and staff moved to the All Saints site.

The Headteacher at the time was Mr. J. P. Kelly, who remained at his post for the next twenty-five years before retiring. He was replaced by Mr. R. Sawyer, who stepped down from service at the end of the 2012/13 academic year. In September 2013, the school's Headteacher was Mrs. Clare Scott, who stepped down from service at the end of the 2016/17 academic year to retire. As of September 2017, the school's new Headteacher is Mr. Sean Pender.

All Saints Catholic High School is currently situated on Granville Road (A6135), next to The Sheffield College in Sheffield.

Ethos
The school has a strong Catholic ethos which is reflected in its motto "Fortis in Fide" (Strength in Faith).

The school, which has a chapel and a chaplaincy team, holds Catholic Mass twice a year.

Facilities
The school has been awarded a Sports College status and is home to one of the biggest sporting facilities in England. The sports facilities are operated by Goals. A new sports hall was built in the summer of 2007. There are also nine AstroTurf pitches available. The school is a Fair Trade school and sells fair trade items on site.

As of 2011, a new school has been expanded (co-located) on the grounds, accommodating the needs of Special Educational Needs and Disability (SEND) students. 
This new extension is called the "Seven Hills School".

Academic performance
The school gets above-average results at GCSE level. At A-Level, it does reasonably well for a state comprehensive school. It is one of six state schools in Sheffield that has a sixth form. Most schools that offer sixth form education are also former grammar schools. Sheffield College, which is located next door, also offers A Levels.

Notable alumni

Alumni of All Saints are entitled to refer to themselves as 'Old Toussainters', in line with the school's origins as De La Salle Grammar, founded by French monks.
 Matt Dickins – former Lincoln City and Blackburn Rovers goalkeeper.
 Mark Gasser – concert pianist.
 Jonathan Marray – professional tennis player. 2012 Wimbledon men's doubles winner.
 Catherine Pickford – Church of England archdeacon

De La Salle College
 Martin Flannery, Labour MP for Sheffield Hillsborough from 1974 to 1992
 Dennis Hackett, former editor of Queen, Nova and Today
 Patrick McGoohan, writer, director, actor Danger Man, The Prisoner
 Andrew Pinder CBE, chairman of Becta since 2006

OFSTED Report

Academy
An OFSTED Short Inspection Report was published in 2018, confirming the 2014 Full Inspection rating of Good, with aspects of the school's work needing improvement.

Pre-Academy
A report at the beginning of 2011, before the school became an Academy, showed an improvement in the school, which was rated "outstanding" by Ofsted.

Changes to the school 2010–11

In 2010, the school began to undergo construction to build new facilities and an entirely new building. The work was due to finish in September 2011. When completed, the school would be able to accommodate an additional 100–200 pupils from Seven Hills (approximate figure). The reason for this was that the school agreed to let Seven Hills' new school be built, meaning All Saints and Seven Hills would both have new equipment.

References

External links
 De La Salle former school
 Site of the former school in Pitsmoor
 EduBase

Catholic secondary schools in the Diocese of Hallam
Secondary schools in Sheffield
Educational institutions established in 1976
Fair trade schools
1976 establishments in England
Academies in Sheffield